No Filter 2 is the third collaborative studio album by American rappers Lil Wyte and JellyRoll. It was released on November 18, 2016 via Bad Apple Inc. Production was primarily handled by Thomas "Greenway" Toner a.k.a. T-Stoner, along with Phil Bogard and Sonny Paradise. It features guest appearances from Ace of Thug Therapy, Bernz of ¡Mayday!, B-Real, DJ Paul, Doobie, Insane Clown Posse, Jackie Chain, Madchild and Struggle Jennings. The album serves as a sequel to their 2013 album, No Filter.

The album peaked at number 47 on the Top R&B/Hip-Hop Albums chart in the United States.

Music videos were released for the songs: "Demons", "My Smoking Song" and "Bad Bitch".

Track listing

Charts

References

2016 albums
Sequel albums
Jelly Roll (singer) albums
Lil Wyte albums
Collaborative albums